Donske may refer to several places in Ukraine:

 Donske, Kirovske Raion, Crimea
 Donske, Simferopol Raion, Crimea
 Donske, Donetsk Oblast
 Donske, Odessa Oblast